Janet Schulman (16 September 1933 – 11 February 2011) was an author of children's books and editor, first at Macmillan Publishers, then at Random House. Schulman was the editor for authors such as Dr. Seuss and Virginia Hamilton and was responsible for the marketing behind Watership Down.

Career 
Schulman began working for Macmillan Publishers in 1959, when she moved to New York City. She had worked before in advertisement in New Orleans and was hired for a position in Macmillan's advertising department. She worked on all of the publisher's divisions, until she was asked to help rewrite one of C. S. Lewis' The Chronicles of Narnia books, at which point she decided to focus on children's books. She was behind one of the first paperback publishing programs focused on children's literature, and was responsible for the marketing of Watership Down, which marked the first time a novel for children appeared on the New York Times bestseller list.

In 1974, she was one of the 185 people let go that year in a mass firing to downsize the company. Schulman, alongside eight other women, filed a class-action complaint against their employer for sexism. In an interview, Schulman said about her firing: "I have maintained all along that I was fired because of my activities helping to form and acting as co-chair of the women's group in the company."

After that, Schulman went to work at Random House during the 1980s and 1990s, where she was the editor responsible for authors such as Dr. Seuss and Virginia Hamilton, and acted as director of children's book marketing, editor-in-chief and publisher of several of Random House's imprints.

In 1984, Schulman helped Random House create a new paperback line focused on beginner readers, which was the first to have on the covers of the books an indication of the reading level expected of the reader.

In 1994 she resigned from her positions at Random House and began working as VP-at-large.

Death 
Schulman died on 11 February 2011, in New York City. She was 77 years old.

Selected works

References 

1933 births
2011 deaths
American women children's writers
American children's writers
American women editors
21st-century American women